In mathematics, singular integrals are central to harmonic analysis and are intimately connected with the study of partial differential equations. Broadly speaking a singular integral is an integral operator

 

whose kernel function K : Rn×Rn → R is singular along the diagonal x = y.  Specifically, the singularity is such that |K(x, y)| is of size |x − y|−n asymptotically as |x − y| → 0. Since such integrals may not in general be absolutely integrable, a rigorous definition must define them as the limit of the integral over |y − x| > ε as ε → 0, but in practice this is a technicality. Usually further assumptions are required to obtain results such as their boundedness on Lp(Rn).

The Hilbert transform

The archetypal singular integral operator is the Hilbert transform H. It is given by convolution against the kernel K(x) = 1/(πx) for x in R. More precisely,

 

The most straightforward higher dimension analogues of these are the Riesz transforms, which replace K(x) = 1/x with

 

All of these operators are bounded on Lp and satisfy weak-type (1, 1) estimates.

Singular integrals of convolution type

A singular integral of convolution type is an operator T defined by convolution with a kernel K that is locally integrable on Rn\{0}, in the sense that

Suppose that the kernel satisfies:

 The size condition on the Fourier transform of K

 The smoothness condition: for some C > 0,

Then it can be shown that T is bounded on Lp(Rn) and satisfies a weak-type (1, 1) estimate.

Property 1. is needed to ensure that convolution with the tempered distribution p.v. K given by the principal value integral

is a well-defined Fourier multiplier on L2. Neither of the properties 1. or 2. is necessarily easy to verify, and a variety of sufficient conditions exist.  Typically in applications, one also has a cancellation condition

 

which is quite easy to check.  It is automatic, for instance, if K is an odd function.  If, in addition, one assumes 2. and the following size condition

 

then it can be shown that 1. follows.

The smoothness condition 2. is also often difficult to check in principle, the following sufficient condition of a kernel K can be used:
 
 
Observe that these conditions are satisfied for the Hilbert and Riesz transforms, so this result is an extension of those result.

Singular integrals of non-convolution type

These are even more general operators. However, since our assumptions are so weak, it is not necessarily the case that these operators are bounded on Lp.

Calderón–Zygmund kernels

A function  is said to be a Calderón–Zygmund kernel if it satisfies the following conditions for some constants C > 0 and δ > 0.

Singular integrals of non-convolution type

T is said to be a singular integral operator of non-convolution type associated to the Calderón–Zygmund kernel K if

 

whenever f and g are smooth and have disjoint support. Such operators need not be bounded on Lp

Calderón–Zygmund operators

A singular integral of non-convolution type T associated to a Calderón–Zygmund kernel K is called a Calderón–Zygmund operator when it is bounded on L2, that is, there is a C > 0 such that

 

for all smooth compactly supported ƒ.

It can be proved that such operators are, in fact, also bounded on all Lp with 1 < p < ∞.

The T(b) theorem

The T(b) theorem provides sufficient conditions for a singular integral operator to be a Calderón–Zygmund operator, that is for a singular integral operator associated to a Calderón–Zygmund kernel to be bounded on L2. In order to state the result we must first define some terms.

A normalised bump is a smooth function φ on Rn supported in a ball of radius 10 and centred at the origin such that |∂α φ(x)| ≤ 1, for all multi-indices |α| ≤ n + 2. Denote by τx(φ)(y) = φ(y − x) and φr(x) = r−nφ(x/r) for all x in Rn and r > 0. An operator is said to be weakly bounded if there is a constant C such that

 

for all normalised bumps φ and ψ. A function is said to be accretive if there is a constant c > 0 such that Re(b)(x) ≥ c for all x in R. Denote by Mb the operator given by multiplication by a function b.

The T(b) theorem states that a singular integral operator T associated to a Calderón–Zygmund kernel is bounded on L2 if it satisfies all of the following three conditions for some bounded accretive functions b1 and b2:
 is weakly bounded;
 is in BMO;
 is in BMO, where Tt is the transpose operator of T.

See also
 Singular integral operators on closed curves

Notes

References
.
.
.
 (in Russian).
. 
,.

External links

 
Harmonic analysis
Real analysis